Maureen O'Farrell is a British actress, probably best known for her role as the feisty but vulnerable Linda Perelli in the Lynda La Plante crime dramas Widows (1983) and Widows 2 (1985).

Maureen O'Farrell is also one of Britain's finest performers and teachers of Egyptian dance. After studying dance and drama at Hull, Maureen travelled to Egypt to learn her craft and has combined her acting work with a career as a professional dancer. Maureen has performed professionally in Egypt, North Africa, Turkey and throughout Europe as well as organising workshops for dance students in the UK. After completing a degree course in Social Anthropology in the Middle East in 1996, Maureen moved away from acting and has worked as a choreographer and technical advisor on Egyptian dance in various film and TV productions. Now known professionally as Sara Farouk Ahmed, Maureen lives in Cairo and continues her performing and teaching career.

Other TV credits include: Minder, Dempsey and Makepeace, C.A.T.S. Eyes, The Bill and Coronation Street.

External links
 

British television actresses
Living people
Year of birth missing (living people)
Place of birth missing (living people)